Several politico-constitutional arrangements use reserved political positions, especially when endeavoring to ensure the rights of women, minorities or other segments of society, or preserving a political balance of power. These arrangements can distort the democratic principle of one person - one vote in order to address special circumstances.

Countries with reserved seats

Europe

Armenia
Since the 2015 Armenian constitutional referendum, electoral law requires that four seats for ethnic minorities (one Russians, Yezidis, Assyrians and Kurds each) are allocated in the National Assembly.

Belgium
The Parliament of the Brussels-Capital Region in Belgium includes 17 reserved seats for the Flemish minority, on a total of 89, but there are no separate electorates.

Croatia
Croatia reserves eight seats from the minorities and three for citizens living abroad in its parliament. There are three seats for Serbs, one for Italians, and a few more for other ethnic groups, where a single representative represents more than one group (there is only one representative for both Czechs and Slovaks).

Cyprus

The Republic of Cyprus is full of reserved political positions. Due to its nature as a bi-communal republic, certain posts are always appropriated among Greek Cypriots and Turkish Cypriots. For example, the president is chosen from the Greek Cypriot community by using separate electoral rolls, whereas the vice president is chosen by the Turkish Cypriot community, using their own separate electoral rolls. Similarly 70% of the parliament are chosen from Greek Cypriots whereas 30% are chosen by and from Turkish Cypriots. In the Supreme Court, there should be one Greek, One Turkish and one neutral foreign judge.

Denmark

The Folketing consists of 179 representatives; including two from Greenland and a further two from the Faroe Islands.

Kosovo 

The Assembly of the Republic of Kosovo has 120 directly elected members; 20 are reserved for national minorities as follows:
 10 seats for the representatives of the Kosovo Serbs.
 4 seats for the representatives of the Romani, Ashkali and Egyptians.
 3 seats for the Bosniaks. 
 2 seats for the Turks.
 1 seat for the Gorani.

Albanian is the official language of the majority, but all languages of minorities such as Serbian, Turkish and Bosnian are used, with simultaneous interpretation.

Slovenia
The National Assembly of Slovenia has 88 members elected by party-list proportional representation. Another two seats are elected by the Italian and Hungarian ethnic minorities using the Borda count.

United Kingdom

Political parties are permitted to restrict the selection of their candidates in constituencies to a specific gender under the Sex Discrimination (Election Candidates) Act 2002; to date, only the Labour Party utilises the law.

The UK also reserves 26 seats in the House of Lords for Church of England bishops, who together are known as the Lords Spiritual.

Asia

Bangladesh
50 seats out of 350 in the Parliament are reserved for women.

China
China's National People's Congress (NPC) includes special delegations for the military of China (the single largest NPC delegation (≈9%)) and Taiwan (a region it claims but does not control). 55 minority ethnic groups are recognized in China and each has as at least one delegate, though they belong to normal region delegations. Additionally, from 1954 to 1974, the NPC included a special delegation specifically for Overseas Chinese who returned to China.

Hong Kong and Macau

Hong Kong and Macau provide for constituencies which represent professional or special interest groups rather than geographical locations. Voters for the members representing these constituencies include both natural persons as well as non-human local entities, including organizations and corporations.

India

India has seats in both houses of parliament, state assemblies, local municipal bodies and village-level institutions reserved for Scheduled Castes and Scheduled Tribes, better-known as Dalits and Adivasis respectively. The election of Dalit and tribal candidates is by the general electorate. Out of 543 constituencies in India's parliament, a total of 131 seats (24.13%) are Reserved or blocked for Representatives from Scheduled Castes (84) and Scheduled Tribes (47) only. This is different from separate electorate practiced in other countries. Many Indian states, like Kerala and Bihar, have parliamentary reserved seats for the Anglo-Indian community, as did the Lok Sabha until 2020.

Iran

Iran reserves a fixed number of seats in the Majlis for certain recognized non-Muslim ethnoreligious groups. To wit, two seats are reserved for the Christian Armenian community, and one seat each is reserved for the Assyrian and Chaldean Catholic, Jewish, and Zoroastrian communities.

Jordan
Jordan has reserved seats for women, Christians, Circassians, Chechens, and Bedouins.

Lebanon

Lebanon specifies the religious affiliation of several of its high officers, such as the President (Maronite), the Prime Minister (Sunni Muslim) and the Parliament's Speaker (Shia Muslim). Every electoral district for the parliamentary elections includes a fixed number of the various religious communities.

Pakistan

Pakistan reserves a fixed number of parliamentary seats for women that is 60 and for minorities that is 10.

Philippines 
Some local legislatures in the Philippines has a reserved seat for indigenous people called "Indigenous People Mandatory Representation". These are elected by the indigenous people themselves.

The Local Government Code also calls for reserved seats in local legislatures for women, workers, and one from the urban poor, indigenous cultural communities, disabled people and other sectors, but for these seats, no law has passed on how these seats will be filled up.

In Congress, no seats are reserved, although sectoral representatives were appointed by the president to the House of Representatives before the application of the party-list system.

Singapore 

Group Representation Constituency (GRC) was created in 1988. GRC scheme entrenches the presence of minority MPs in Parliament, ensuring that interests of minority communities are represented in Parliament. In a GRC, a number of candidates comes together to stand for elections to Parliament as a group. Each voter of a GRC casts a ballot for a team of candidates, and not for individual candidates. The original stated purpose of GRCs was to guarantee a minimum representation of minorities in Parliament and ensure that there would always be a multiracial Parliament instead of one made up of a single race.

The office of President will be reserved for a particular racial group (Chinese, Malay and Indian/other minority) — if that community has not been represented for five presidential terms.

Taiwan
Since 2008, in the Legislative Yuan of Taiwan, of the total 34 seats of party-list proportional representation, at least half of the party-nominated candidates must be reserved for women. For example, if one party elected 3 candidates of the party-list in the Legislative Yuan, 2 of them must be women. Along with this, since the 1970s six seats are reserved for the indigenous people of Taiwan. There are two constituencies consisting of three seats each reserved for the Highland Aborigine people and the Lowland Aborigine people.

Africa

Eritrea
10 seats out of 105 seats in Parliament are reserved for women.

Rwanda
In the Parliament of Rwanda, a minimum of 30% of elected members of the 26-member Senate must be women. In the 80-member Chamber of Deputies, 24 of these seats are reserved for women, elected through a joint assembly of local government officials; another 3 seats are reserved for youth and disabled members.

Partly resulting from this arrangement, 45 female deputies were elected to the Parliament in 2008, making the country the first and only independent country to possess a female majority in its national legislature.

Tanzania
At least 20% of seats are required to be set aside for women in accordance with Article 66.1(b) of the Constitution. Currently 113 of 393 (28%) are set aside.

Uganda
The Ugandan constitution provides for a reserved woman's parliamentary seat from each of the 39 districts.

Americas

Argentina
The Argentine law requires for a 50% quota for female candidates for Congress.

Colombia
Under the 2016 peace agreement brokered between the Colombian government and the FARC rebel group, five seats in the Senate and five seats in the House of Representatives are reserved for former FARC combatants.

United States
Due to treaties signed by the United States in 1830 and 1835, two Native American tribes (the Cherokee and Choctaw) each hold the right to a non-voting delegate in the House of Representatives. As of 2019, only the Cherokee Nation has ever attempted to exercise that right.

The Maine House of Representatives reserves three non-voting positions for the Passamaquoddy, Maliseet, and Penobscot.

Oceania

Fiji

Fiji used to provide for the election of specific numbers of Members of Parliament on the basis of three racially defined constituencies: the indigenous Fijians, the Fijian Indians and the "General" electorate.

New Zealand

There are currently seven New Zealand Parliament constituencies – known as the Māori electorates – that are reserved for representatives of the Māori people. Māori electorates were introduced in 1867, but have undergone several changes since then. Māori may enrol either in a Māori electorate or on the general roll, but not both. Since 1967 there has not been any specific requirement for candidates in Māori electorates to be Māori themselves, and anyone on either the Māori roll or the General roll can stand as a candidate. Technically, therefore, these seats should not be described as "reserved" as there is no legal or constitutional guarantee that the successful candidate will themselves be of Māori descent. So far, however, every MP from a Māori electorate has been Māori. Also to note, is that under New Zealand's mixed-member proportional (MMP) electoral system, it is the party vote that is most important. All voters, including Māori, are deemed to be on the same master roll in terms of voting for party lists.

Countries formerly applying reserved political positions

Afghanistan 
During the Islamic Republic of Afghanistan, the constitution guaranteed at least 64 delegates to be female in the lower house of the bicameral National Assembly ("The elections law shall adopt measures to attain, through the electorate system, general and fair representation for all the people of the country, and proportionate to the population of very province, on average, at least two females shall be the elected members of the House of People from each province."), while Kochi nomads elected 10 representatives through a single national constituency. Moreover, "one third of the members (of the House of Elders) shall be appointed by the President, for a five-year term, from amongst experts and experienced personalities, including two members from amongst the impaired and handicapped, as well as two from nomads. The President shall appoint fifty percent of these individuals from amongst women."

German Democratic Republic
East Germany reserved seats in the Volkskammer for representatives of women, trade unions and youth organisations.

Greece
During the 1920s and 1930s there was a system of separate electoral curiae for Muslim and Jewish electors in Greece, with reserved seats.

Palestine (British mandate)
During the Mandatory Palestine, at the third election (1931) of its Assembly of Representatives, there were three curiae, for the Ashkenazi Jews, the Sephardi Jews and for the Yemeni Jews.

Palestinian Authority
While the Palestinian Authority makes no reservations within the Palestinian Legislative Council (there were reserved seats for Christians and Samaritans in the electoral law for the 1996 Palestinian general election), certain positions in local government are guaranteed to certain minority groups, in order to retain particular traditional cultural influence and diversity. For example, the mayor of Bethlehem is required to be a Christian, even though the city itself currently has a Muslim majority.

Syria
Syria enjoyed an electoral system like Lebanon's, at least for the parliamentary elections, up to 1949, when the subdivisions among each religion were suppressed, then there were only reserved seats for Christians up to 1963, when the Ba'athist regime suppressed free elections.

Zimbabwe

Historically, Zimbabwe reserved 20 of the 100 seats in Parliament for the white minority, until these seats were abolished by constitutional amendment in 1987. Currently, 60 of the 270 seats in the House of Assembly are reserved for women.

Reserved seats for expatriates
See also Overseas constituency

 Algeria reserves eight of its 382 parliamentary seats for expatriates, many of whom reside in France. 
 Cape Verde has three overseas seats reserved for expatriates 
 Colombia reserves one overseas seat to represent all expatriates
 Croatia reserves no more than six seats in parliament for expatriates. The number of seats assigned to emigrants is based on participation rates in the election. 
 Ecuador has six parliamentary seats for expatriates 
 France reserves 12 seats in the Senate for expatriates, and 11 seats in the National Assembly.
 Italy reserves seats in its Parliament for Italian expatriates, with twelve members of the Chamber of Deputies and six in the Senate representing an Overseas constituency.
 Portugal's Assembly of the Republic has four seats reserved for Portuguese living abroad, two for those living in Europe, the other two for those living in other parts of the world.

Floating reserved seats
 In Mauritius, the National Assembly consists of 70 members, 62 elected for a five-year term in a constituency in which 3 are elected in the constituencies of Mauritius (mainland) and 2 are elected in the constituency of Rodriques. From 4 up to 8 additional members, known as "best losers" appointed by the Electoral Supervisory Commission "with a view to correct any imbalance in community representation in Parliament".
 New Zealand reserves a proportion of its parliamentary seats for the representation of persons electing to register on a separate Māori roll. The number of seats depends upon the number of people on the roll — there are currently seven seats. See Māori electorates.

Exemption of the election threshold
In several countries, political parties representing recognized ethnic minorities are exempted from the election threshold. Examples are listed below.

Denmark: German minority party of Schleswig Party
Germany: Danish and Frisian minorities (in Schleswig-Holstein), Sorbian minority (in Brandenburg) in fact this only applies to the South Schleswig Voters' Association
Poland: German minority
Romania: 18 recognized minorities
Serbia

Quotas inside party lists
 Iraq held its first post-Saddam parliamentary elections in January 2005 under an electoral law providing for compulsory integration of women on the candidates lists, like several European countries with a proportional electoral system.

See also 
 Affirmative action

Sources

Political systems
Minority rights
Affirmative action